Bicyclus heathi is a butterfly in the family Nymphalidae. It is found in the north‐eastern part of the Democratic Republic of Congo.

The wingspan is 27 mm. The wings are dark reddish brown without eyespots, except a small amount of lighter scales placed. Females are larger and the wing colour is paler, with fewer reddish tones, than the males.

Etymology
The species is named in honour of Alan Heath, who collected the holotype and one paratype during a visit to the Irangi forest region in 1978.

References

Elymniini
Butterflies described in 2015
Butterflies of Africa